Renkum is a municipality and a town in the eastern Netherlands.
Renkum is situated along the river Rhine. The municipality Renkum is part of the Stadsregio (English: City region) Arnhem-Nijmegen.

The surrounding of the municipality are mainly forest and river forelands. In the forest one can find tumulus of thousand years old. Findings from these tumulus can be seen in the Historic museum in Arnhem.

History
Renkum is more than a thousand years old. The thousand-year anniversary was celebrated in 1970. In the early days, the name was written as Redinchem. In the 19th century Renkum developed itself. There existed six paper mills, three water-cornmills and one water-oil mill. There were two factories, a treacle factory and a potato starch-flour factory. There was also a beer brewery and a tavern de Bok.

Nowadays there is still paper industry The company is Parenco B.V., acquired by H2 Equity Partners in 2012.

Population centres

Topography

Dutch Topographic map of the municipality of Renkum, June 2015.

Notable people from Renkum

 Nol Hendriks (1937 in Renkum - 2017), businessman and football executive
 Frank Versteegh (born 1954 in Oosterbeek) a Dutch aerobatics pilot
 Derk Bolt (born 1955 in Renkum) a Dutch TV presenter, editor and producer 
 Lans Bovenberg (born 1958 in Oosterbeek) a Dutch economist and academic
 Stephan Brenninkmeijer (born 1964 in Doorwerth), a Dutch film director, screenwriter, and producer 
 Eric Corton (born 1969 in Oosterbeek) a Dutch presenter, actor, author and DJ 
 Constant Kusters (born 1970 in Oosterbeek), politician
 Bjorn Stenvers (born 1972) international museum director, grew up in Renkum
 Marianne Thieme (born 1972) a Dutch politician, author and animal rights activist; grew up in Renkum
 Esmée Denters (born 1988) a Dutch singer and YouTube celebrity; grew up in Oosterbeek

Sport 

 Piet de Zwarte (born 1948 in Renkum), water polo player, bronze medallist at the 1976 Summer Olympics 
 Marion Bultman (born 1960, in Oosterbeek) a Dutch sailor, competed at the 1988 Summer Olympics
 Ronald Koeman (born 1963) ex-footballer with 535 club caps, current coach of the Netherlands national football team, lived in Renkum
 Peter Hofstede (born 1967 in Oosterbeek) a retired football striker with 370 club caps
 Albertino Essers (born 1969 in Oosterbeek) a former Dutch professional darts player
 Rein Baart (born 1972 in Oosterbeek) a Dutch former footballer with 254 club caps
 Kay van Dijk (born 1984 in Renkum) a Dutch volleyball player, competed in the 2004 Summer Olympics 
 Xan de Waard (born 1995 in Renkum), field hockey player, silver medalist at the 2016 Summer Olympics

Image gallery

References

External links

Official website

 
Municipalities of Gelderland
Populated places in Gelderland